Royal Sovereign can refer to :

 , any of various ships of the Royal Navy
 , a class of pre-dreadnought battleships of the Royal Navy
 , a class of Royal Navy dreadnoughts sometimes referred to as the Royal Sovereign class
 Royal_Sovereign_(1829_ship), a merchant ship used to transport convicts to Australia
 Royal Sovereign, a GWR 3031 Class locomotive of the Great Western Railway, England
 The Royal Sovereign Lighthouse, Eastbourne, England
 The Royal Sovereign shoal which the lighthouse marks
 Royal Sovereign International, Inc., an international supplier of appliances and office products, acquired by Dickinson Robinson Group

See also

 , a cruise ship class of the Royal Caribbean line
Sovereign (disambiguation)